Paul Johnston (born 29 May 1968) is a British diplomat, and the British Ambassador to Ireland since September 2020.

Early life 
Paul Charles Johnston was born on 29 May 1968 to Charles Johnston and Muriel Johnston (née Hall).

Charles Johnston worked for Woolworth's. Muriel Johnston worked for a trade union and is active in the Galashiels Opera.

Johnston was educated at St Margaret's Primary School and then the Galashiels Academy in Galashiels, Scotland. At Galashiels Johnston studied French, German, and Spanish and described the efforts of his languages teacher as a possible inspiration for joining the Foreign Office. Johnston then attended the University of Glasgow, graduating with an MA (Hons) in Political Science and Government.

In his youth, Johnston participated in performances of The King and I and Carousel for the Galashiels Opera.

Career 
Paul Johnston joined the Civil Service in 1990, working for the Ministry of Defence until 1993.

In 1993, Johnston joined the Foreign and Commonwealth Office as the Desk Officer for Bosnia until 1995.

Johnston served as the Private Secretary to the British Ambassador to France from 1995 to 1999. This was Johnston's first foreign posting.

Johnston described negotiating on behalf of the European Union on the language on the responsibility to protect, adopted by the UN World Summit in 2005, as a personal highlight of his career.

Johnston was appointed the British Ambassador to Sweden from August 2011 to August 2015.

Johnston was the British Permanent Representative to NATO from 2016 to 2017.

He served as the British Ambassador to the European Union's Political and Security Committee from 2017 to January 2020.

Ambassador to Ireland 
Johnston was appointed the British Ambassador to Ireland in September 2020.

In December 2020, Johnston published an open letter describing the EU–UK Trade and Cooperation Agreement as a "good deal for the UK and the EU, and in particular for the UK and Ireland".

On 5 March 2021, the Irish Times published a letter from Johnston, setting out the rationale for the decision of the British government to unilaterally extend the grace period for post-Brexit checks on some goods entering Northern Ireland from Great Britain.

In March 2021, Johnston revealed that Ireland is "high up" on the list of countries to receive surplus COVID-19 vaccines once British vaccination targets are met.

Personal life 
Johnston married Nicola Carol Maskell in 2004. Johnston walks recreationally.

References

External links 
 

Paul Johnston's blog at the Foreign, Commonwealth and Development Office.

Living people
21st-century British diplomats
Ambassadors of the United Kingdom to Ireland
Ambassadors of the United Kingdom to Sweden
1968 births
People educated at Galashiels Academy
People from Galashiels
Alumni of the University of Glasgow
Permanent Representatives of the United Kingdom to NATO